Raimon Tolosana-Delgado is currently working at , Germany.  Tolosana-Delgado received the Felix Chayes Prize in 2013, and the Andrei Borisovich Vistelius Research Award in 2007, from the International Association for Mathematical Geosciences. He is an elected Executive Vice President of the International Association for Mathematical Geosciences

Education
MS in Engineering Geology, in 2001, Technical University of Catalonia and University of Barcelona
PhD in Mathematical Petrology, in 2005 University of Girona

Selected Book

Vera Pawlowsky-Glahn, Juan José Egozcue, Raimon Tolosana-Delgado, 2015. Modeling and Analysis of Compositional Data. Wiley, 256 p.

K. Gerald van den Boogaart, 2013. Analyzing Compositional Data with R. Springer-Verlag Berlin Heidelberg, 258 p.

References

Living people
University of Girona alumni
Polytechnic University of Catalonia alumni
Place of birth missing (living people)
1976 births
Spanish geologists
Spanish expatriates in Germany
Petrologists